Kameron is a given name. Notable people with the given name include:

Kameron Alexander (born 1988), American singer, songwriter and record producer
Kameron Canaday (born 1993), American football player
Kameron Chancellor (born 1988), American football player
Kameron Chatman (born 1996), American basketball player
Kameron Cline (born 1998), American football player
Kameron Edwards (born 1996), American basketball player
Kameron Fox (born 1977), Bermudian cricketer
Kameron Hankerson, American basketball player
Kameron Hurley, American writer
Kameron Kelly (born 1996), American football player
Kameron Langley (born 1999), American basketball player
Kameron Loe (born 1981), American baseball player
Kameron Marlowe (born 1997), American country singer
Kameron Michaels (born 1986), American drag performer 
Kameron Mickolio (born 1984), American baseball player
Kameron Misner (born 1998), American baseball player 
Kameron Pearce-Paul (born 1997), English rugby league player
Kameron Taylor (born 1994), American basketball player for Maccabi Tel Aviv in the Israeli Basketball Premier League and the EuroLeague

See also
Cameron